Ate or ATE may refer to:

Organizations
 Active Training and Education Trust, a not-for-profit organization providing "Superweeks", holidays for children in the United Kingdom
 Association of Technical Employees, a trade union, now called the National Association of Broadcast Employees and Technicians
 Swiss Association for Transport and Environment, a sustainable public transport association
 ATEbank, a Greek bank, originally Agrotiki Trapeza Ellados 'Agricultural Bank of Greece'
 ATE, originally Alfred Teves Automobiltechnisches Material und Zubehörteile, a manufacturer of automotive components, now part of Continental AG

Science and technology
 Automated telephone exchange
 Automatic test equipment, any apparatus that performs tests on a device, known as the Device Under Test (DUT) or Unit Under Test (UUT), using automation to quickly perform measurements and evaluate the test results
 Average treatment effect, a measure used to compare treatments in experiments
 111 Ate, an asteroid
 -ate, a derivative of a specified element or compound; especially a salt or ester of an acid whose name ends in -ic

Other
 Atë, in Greek mythology, the personification of ruin, folly, and delusion (goddess)
 Ate-u-tiv, Tiv architecture
 Ate, jelly (fruit preserves) in Mexican cuisine, e.g. ate de membrillo
 Ate District , Lima, Peru
 After the event insurance, a form of legal expenses insurance

People with the given name
 Ate de Jong (born 1953), Dutch film director
 Ate Glow, Filipino comedian

See also
 Eat (irregular verb)